Super Cars II is a 1991 top-view racing game developed by Magnetic Fields, and published by Gremlin Graphics Software Ltd. The game was available for the Amiga and then the Atari ST. It is the sequel to the 1990 game Super Cars. The game was released for DOS as Super Cars International in 1996.

An Alfa Romeo SZ appears in the title graphics.

Gameplay

Reception

Super Cars II received generally favorable reviews upon release. Carsten Borgmeier wrote in Amiga Joker magazine, "Super Cars II is the stuff computer runabouts dream of!"

Top Gear ranked Super Cars II No. 48 of the 50 greatest driving games for its career mode, which it said had not been surpassed since. Digital Spy listed the game as one of the 30 greatest Amiga games, citing its introduction of split-screen multiplayer and its combination of "plug-and-play simplicity with smooth handling and a palpable sense of speed." Den of Geek considered it to be one of the most underappreciated games for Atari ST.

References

External links
Super Cars II at Atari Mania
Super Cars II at Amiga Hall of Light

1991 video games
Amiga games
Atari ST games
DOS games
Gremlin Interactive games
Multiplayer and single-player video games
Top-down racing video games
Video games scored by Barry Leitch
Video games developed in the United Kingdom
Magnetic Fields (video game developer) games